Vasilopoulos or Vassilopoulos is a Greek surname. The feminine form is Vasilopoulou (Βασιλοπούλου). It may refer to:

Balanos Vasilopoulos (1694–1760), Greek scholar, cleric and writer
Christos Vasilopoulos (born 1978), Greek actor
Fotis Vasilopoulos (born 1986), Greek basketball player
Panagiotis Vasilopoulos (born 1984), Greek basketball player

See also
Alfa-Beta Vassilopoulos, Greek supermarket chain

Greek-language surnames
Surnames
Patronymic surnames